The Icelandic National Front is a right-wing populist political party in Iceland.

History
On 27 February 2016, the Right-Green People's Party was disbanded and merged into the party.

On 3 March 2016, the National Front reached out to controversial Independence Party member Ásmund Friðriksson, asking him to join the party.

On 15 August 2016, the party organized a protest against revisions to Iceland's immigration laws at Austurvöllur square in front of the Parliament building.

They participated in the 2016 parliamentary election, only running candidates in the South and Northwest constituencies after failing to obtain ballot access for the remaining four; in part due to two of their senior members, Gústaf Níelsson and Gunnlaugur Ingvarsson, defecting shortly before the election and taking the lists of signatures for the two Reykjavík constituencies with them.

The party was due to take part in the 2017 election and had planned on running in the three constituencies in the capital area and the South, but withdrew all its lists after false signatures had been discovered on two of them.

In August 2017 Gústaf Níelsson and Gunnlaugur Ingvarssons launched a new party Frelsisfokkurinn (the Freedom Party), which attracted members from the Icelandic National Front, although Níelsson shortly thereafter quit politics and moved to Spain.

Policies
The Icelandic National Front aims to defend Iceland's sovereignty and independence and national culture, language and customs. The party is wholly opposed to multiculturalism and wants Iceland out of the Schengen Area. They are in favour of debt adjustment. The party also wishes to introduce a new currency in Iceland that is linked to the United States dollar and it wants to eliminate indexation. Furthermore, they want to focus on the interests of the elderly and disabled. Other proposals from the party program include introducing a Swiss-style referendum system.

New mosques, burqas, female genital mutilation and Islamic schools are opposed by the party, although the party claims that the religious freedom as stated in the Icelandic constitution is not opposed. Christian and Nordic culture is supported by the party. The founder and first chairman of the party, Helgi Helgason, said that his opposition against Islam is inspired by Ayaan Hirsi Ali.

Electoral results

Parliament

Chairpersons

See also
 Islam in Iceland

References

External links
 Official website 
 Icelandic National Front|Party strategy (PDF format)

2016 establishments in Iceland
Criticism of multiculturalism
Eurosceptic parties in Iceland
Far-right politics in Iceland
Icelandic nationalism
Nationalist parties in Iceland
Anti-Islam sentiment in Europe
Political parties established in 2016
Right-wing populism in Iceland
Right-wing parties in Europe
Anti-Islam political parties in Europe